The Irish Intermediate Cup is a Northern Irish football competition for teams of intermediate status, including NIFL Premiership reserve sides. It is a straight knock-out tournament and is currently sponsored by McCombs Coach Travel.

The current holders are Rathfriland Rangers.

Past winners

 1892–93 Distillery Rovers*
 1893–94 Glentoran II*
 1894–95 Milltown
 1895–96 Cliftonville Olympic*
 1896–97 Linfield Swifts*
 1897–98 Glentoran II*
 1898–99 Linfield Swifts*
 1899–1900 Cliftonville Olympic*
 1900–01 Linfield Swifts*
 1901–02 Cliftonville Olympic*
 1902–03 Distillery Rovers*
 1903–04 YMCA
 1904–05 Frankfort
 1905–06 Forth River
 1906–07 Forth River
 1907–08 Glenavon
 1908–09 Glentoran II*
 1909–10 St James' Gate
 1910–11 Glenavon
 1911–12 Derry Guilds
 1912–13 Glentoran II*
 1913–14 Belfast Celtic II*
 1914–15 UCD
 1915–16 Glentoran II*
 1916–17 Strandville
 1917–18 Glentoran II*
 1918–19 Cup withheld
 1919–20 St James' Gate
 1920–21 Queen's Island
 1921–22 Linfield Rangers
 1922–23 Dunmurry
 1923–24 Willowfield
 1924–25 Linfield Rangers
 1925–26 Ballyclare Comrades
 1926–27 Crusaders
 1927–28 Willowfield
 1928–29 Linfield Swifts*
 1929–30 Dunmurry
 1930–31 Glentoran II*
 1931–32 Broadway United
 1932–33 Dunville's
 1933–34 Sunnyside
 1934–35 Belfast Celtic II*
 1935–36 Belfast Celtic II*
 1936–37 Belfast Celtic II*
 1937–38 Crusaders
 1938–39 Crusaders
 1939–40 Belfast Celtic II*
 1940–41 Glentoran II*
 1941–42 Bangor Reserves*
 1942–43 Larne Olympic*
 1943–44 Bangor Reserves*
 1944–45 Bangor Reserves*
 1945–46 Linfield Swifts*
 1946–47 Dundela
 1947–48 Distillery II*
 1948–49 Linfield Swifts*
 1949–50 Ballyclare Comrades
 1950–51 Ballyclare Comrades
 1951–52 Brantwood
 1952–53 Brantwood
 1953–54 Ballyclare Comrades
 1954–55 Dundela
 1955–56 Linfield Swifts*
 1956–57 Linfield Swifts*
 1957–58 Newry Town
 1958–59 Larne
 1959–60 Ballyclare Comrades
 1960–61 Ballyclare Comrades
 1961–62 Glentoran II*
 1962–63 Ballyclare Comrades
 1963–64 Ballyclare Comrades
 1964–65 Coleraine Reserves*
 1965–66 Dundela
 1966–67 Newry Town
 1967–68 Chimney Corner
 1968–69 Coleraine Reserves*
 1969–70 Larne
 1970–71 Ards II*
 1971–72 Linfield Swifts*
 1972–73 Brantwood
 1973–74 Limavady United
 1974–75 Dundela
 1975–76 Carrick Rangers
 1976–77 Carrick Rangers
 1977–78 Dungannon Swifts
 1978–79 RUC
 1979–80 RUC
 1980–81 Newry Town
 1981–82 Chimney Corner
 1982–83 Chimney Corner
 1983–84 Dundela
 1984–85 RUC
 1985–86 Banbridge Town
 1986–87 RUC
 1987–88 Short Brothers
 1988–89 Dundela
 1989–90 Ballyclare Comrades
 1990–91 Brantwood
 1991–92 Dungannon Swifts
 1992–93 Dundela
 1993–94 Portstewart
 1994–95 Ballinamallard United
 1995–96 Limavady United
 1996–97 Chimney Corner
 1997–98 Loughgall
 1998–99 Dundela
 1999–2000 Dundela
 2000–01 Dundela
 2001–02 Linfield Swifts*
 2002–03 Harland & Wolff Welders
 2003–04 Linfield Swifts*
 2004–05 Glenavon
 2005–06 Donegal Celtic
 2006–07 Harland & Wolff Welders
 2007–08 Loughgall
 2008–09 Knockbreda Parish
 2009–10 Donegal Celtic
 2010–11 Carrick Rangers
 2011–12 Newry City
 2012–13 Institute
 2013–14 Bangor
 2014–15 Carrick Rangers
 2015–16 Institute
 2016–17 Limavady United
 2017–18 Queen's University
 2018–19 Crumlin Star
 2019–20 Dollingstown
 2020–21 Not played due to COVID-19 pandemic
 2021–22 Rathfriland Rangers

NB. * denotes reserve teams of senior clubs

Performance by club

 * indicates reserve team
 † now known as PSNI
 ƒ previously Newry Town

See also
Irish Cup

References

External links
 Intermediate Cup Archive at the Irish Football Club Project

 

Former All-Ireland association football competitions
6
Association football clubs established in 1892
1892 establishments in Ireland